Oxarat is an unincorporated community within Rural Municipality of Reno No. 51, Saskatchewan, Canada. The former town-site is located 15 km west of Highway 21, about 15 km north of the village of Consul and Highway 13.

Population

Oxarat, like many other communities throughout Saskatchewan, has struggled to maintain a sturdy population causing it to become a ghost town, with few or no residents.

Education

Oxarat no longer has a school, but those who may live in Oxarat and area are sent to the neighboring village of Consul which has a school that covers Kindergarten to Grade 12 serving approximately 100 students.

See also

 List of communities in Saskatchewan

References

Reno No. 51, Saskatchewan
Unincorporated communities in Saskatchewan
Populated places established in 1910
Ghost towns in Saskatchewan
Division No. 4, Saskatchewan